Gredilla de Sedano is a hamlet and minor local entity located in the municipality of Valle de Sedano, in Burgos province, Castile and León, Spain. As of 2020, it has a population of 14.

Geography 
Gredilla de Sedano is located 49km north of Burgos.

References

Populated places in the Province of Burgos